Harriton may refer to:

The Harriton House, a historic house in Lower Merion Township, Pennsylvania
Harriton, Pennsylvania, a suburb of Philadelphia
Harriton High School, the public high school serving Harrition, and a part of the Lower Merion School District
 Harriton v Stephens, a decision of the High Court of Australia 
 People with the surname Harriton:
 Abraham Harriton, Romanian-born American painter
 Lisa Harriton, American singer-songwriter, keyboardist and sound designer